Patricia Diaz Dennis (born October 2, 1946) is an American lawyer who served as Assistant Secretary of State for Human Rights and Humanitarian Affairs from 1992 to 1993.

Biography

Patricia Diaz Dennis was born in Santa Rita, New Mexico on October 2, 1946, the daughter of Porfirio Madrid Diaz and Mary Romero.  She attended the University of California, Los Angeles, graduating with an A.B. in 1970. She then attended Loyola Law School and received a J.D. in 1973.

After law school, she joined Paul, Hastings, Janofsky & Walker as an associate attorney. She practiced there until 1976, when she took an in-house job in the law department of the Pacific Lighting Company.  In 1978, she joined the labor law department of the American Broadcasting Company.

In 1983, President of the United States Ronald Reagan appointed Dennis to the National Labor Relations Board.  She served there until 1986, when Reagan named her as a commissioner on the Federal Communications Commission.

She returned to the private practice of law in 1991, joining Jones Day as a partner. In 1993, she joined Sprint as a vice president.

In 1992, President George H. W. Bush nominated Dennis to be Assistant Secretary of State for Human Rights and Humanitarian Affairs and, after Senate confirmation, Dennis held this position from August 24, 1992 until January 20, 1993.

Upon leaving the United States Department of State, Dennis joined Sullivan & Cromwell as special counsel for telecommunications matters. She joined SBC Communications as a vice president in 1995, and worked there until 2005. In 2015, she was elected to the board of US Steel Corporation.

Long active in the Girl Scouts of the USA, in 2005, Dennis was elected as that organization's chairperson.

References

1946 births
Living people
Loyola Law School alumni
New Mexico Republicans
Paul Hastings associates
People from Santa Rita, New Mexico
Sullivan & Cromwell people
United States Assistant Secretaries of State
University of California, Los Angeles alumni
Reagan administration personnel
George H. W. Bush administration personnel
National Labor Relations Board officials